Plaridel, officially the Municipality of Plaridel,  is a 1st class municipality in the province of Bulacan, Philippines. According to the 2020 census, it has a population of 114,432 people.

With the expansion of Metro Manila, the municipality is now part of Manila's built-up area which reaches as far north as San Ildefonso, Bulacan.

Etymology
On December 29, 1936, a bill was passed and approved changing the town's name from Quingua to 'Plaridel', in honor of the great hero of Bulacan, Marcelo H. del Pilar.

History
Like many towns in Bulacan, Plaridel has its niche in Philippine history as the site of the Battle of Quingua during the Philippine–American War as part of the defense of the First Philippine Republic against the Northern Campaign of the American Army. The battle, manned by Pablo Tecson—Lt. Colonel Pablo Ocampo Tecson of San Miguel, Bulacan—under Gregorio del Pilar on the side of the First Philippine Republic, led to the death of Col. John Stotsenberg of the American Army on April 23, 1899. A marker now stands at the site of the battle in barangay Agnaya.

Plaridel's history can be traced through records back to 1581 in the early years of the Spanish colonization. The Augustinian friars from the Malolos Convent discovered a vast forest in 1581 then named as Binto; this would later be known as Quingua. As per the history of the Parish of St. James the Apostle, 2001 issue, Quingua was established by the Augustinian Friars of Malolos who initially named it "Encomienda Binto" (Barangay Bintog got its name from this settlement). They built a visita (chapel of ease) and placed it under the jurisdiction of Fray Mateo Mendoza, the prior of Malolos.

The visita of Binto was elevated to an independent parish named Parroquia de Santiago Apostol, and the whole of Quingua was separated from Malolos and was created as a new pueblo on September 27, 1602.

Plaridel is traversed by Angat River and Tabang River. The Angat River, otherwise known as Quingua River, flows directly to Calumpit, Bulacan, meeting the Pampanga River. The Tabang River is a distributary of Angat River via the Bustos Dam upriver. It also crosses Plaridel and divides into two bodies of water in the middle of the present poblacion of the municipality, with one distributary flowing towards an irrigation project while another, still called Tabang River, flows toward Manila Bay after passing through the towns of Guiguinto and Bulakan. The water of this river was called "tabáng" to refer to its fresh water.

Initially very few people lived in the town, and most were closely related. Each group had a leader called "tandis". Different groups spoke different languages; Pampango, Pangasinan, Ilocano and Tagalog. From Malolos, the friar curate frequently visited the place, preaching the Catholic faith, using the "balsa" or bamboo raft as his means of transportation upriver and back through Angat River. The missionaries decided to clear the land and establish settlements, from which they could work to bring unity to the people. They needed ideas to bring this about, so each "tandis" drew up a plan to pursue. The groups of people labored, so much so that when the priest returned seven years later, he found the area completely cleared. The priests' party inquired among the natives as to whom the credit should go, and the Pampangos exclaimed, "Quing wawa". Thereafter, every now and then, to every question of the friars the people would reply "Quing wa". As a consequence, the place had come to be referred to as Quingua.

During the presidency of Manuel L. Quezon, the then "Alcalde", or Town Mayor, of Quinga, Jose J. Mariano, took the initiative of renaming the town. Representative  Pedro Magsalin, a friend of the Alcalde, sponsored the bill changing the name of the town from Quingua to Plaridel. The bill was passed by the Philippine Congress and was approved by the President, and on December 29, 1936, the town was renamed as 'Plaridel', in honor of the great hero of Bulacan, Marcelo H. del Pilar. The celebrations that followed were attended by political luminaries of the time, including Speaker Gil Montilla, Congressman Magsalin, Nicolas Buendia, Eulogio Rodriguez, Elpidio Quirino and Governor José Padilla, Sr.

Notable families from Plaridel include the Vergel de Dios family (originally from Baliuag and that donated the public market of the town), the Garcías, the Buhains, and San Diegos.

Geography

Barangays
Plaridel is divided into 19 barangays. In 1954, sitio Mayamot in Barrio Banga was changed to Bagong Silang while a sitio in the eastern part of barrio Tabang, called Bagong Silang, was created.

Climate

Demographics

Economy

Government

Elected officials

Local Government Offices

Office of the Municipal Mayor

Position                                              Name                                            Salary Grade                  Description

Municipal Administrator                     Leonora Vivas                                24                                   Municipal Department Head

Asst. Municipal Administrator            Engr. Edilberto Mendoza                22

Office of Municipal Budget Officer

Position                                           Name                                              Salary Grade                  Description

Local Budget Officer                        Jeffrey Ryan M. Tantingco              24                                   Municipal Department Head

Tourism

Parish Church of Santiago Apostol

The Plaridel Church was initially a mission chapel built by the Augustinians in Malolos made of light materials. The chapel was located near River at Lumang Bayan and transferred to present site. It is clearly evident why the said Barrio named Lumang Bayan means-Old Poblacion. From 1590 to 1602, Quingua was administered by Friar Curate from Malolos Church which close at hand.

The present church was built in 1602 and established as the town church of the newly created Pueblo de Quingua.

Plaridel is one of the earliest settlement to be established at around 1590 as Encomienda. Its Parish Church of Santiago Apostol has one of the unique Moorish architectural style among the Augustinian Churches in the province. It was here that the money and jewels of san Agustin in Intramuros, Manila were kept during British Occupation in 1762–63.

The church is small and its two level facade is bare. However, the crowning pediment is elaborate consisting of a pair of volutes with the inner space filled with triangular patterns and floral embellishments that first glance can be mistaken as having a Moorish influence because of the minaret like dome formed. In between the volutes are a series of spaced relieves of cherubs, ramilletes, two saints including that of St. Augustine and the pierced heart which is the symbol of the Augustinian Order. The octagonal and tapering belltower on the other hand sits on a quadrilateral base and rises 4 levels.Visita Iglesia: The old churches of Bulacan, Part 1 of 2

The Parish Church of Santiago Apostol is the location of GMA Network's Fantaserye Darna (2009), Zaido (2007), Iglot (2011) and afternoon drama series, Nita Negrita (2011), Broken Vow (2012). And the Judy Ann Santos-Sarah Geronimo Movie Hating Kapatid in July 2010.

And recently, ABS-CBN's drama anthology Maalaala mo kaya: Toga, starring Albie Casiño and Erich Gonzales and the episode of Police Uniform" starring Empress and Joseph Marco.

Salubong Festival or Horse Festival

Salubong Festival celebrated annually every December 29. It's called salubong or welcome  because they welcome the St. James the Greater's equestrian replica from Sipat. It's also called Horse festival because they paraded calesas, tiburins (non-roofed calesa) and an only riding on the horse (equestrian) and holding a horse racing in the afternoon.

Other Attractions
Battle Of Quingua Monument
Walter Mart Plaridel
Puregold Plaridel
Primark Town Center Plaridel
Plaridel Airport
Grass Garden Resort and Villas
Villa Emmanuela Wavepool & Resort
Eugenio's Garden Resort
Sir Nico Guesthouse and Resort
Samarah private Resort Bintog Plaridel
Shahana Place Private Resort/Guesthouse

Gallery

See also
List of renamed cities and municipalities in the Philippines

References

External links

 [ Philippine Standard Geographic Code]
Philippine Census Information
Plaridel Bulacan

Municipalities of Bulacan